Gionata is a masculine Italian given name. Notable people with the name include:

Gionata Mingozzi (1984–2008), Italian footballer
Gionata Verzura (born 1992), Thai footballer

Italian masculine given names